The Malt Shovel is a Grade II listed public house at Potter Street, Spondon, Derby. The pub is known for its unmodernised period interiors and internal design.

Description

The pub has its own individual character, with a number of rooms from a large bar to small "snugs". The decoration is suggestive of times gone by; in fact the pub is on the Campaign for Real Ale's National Inventory of Historic Pub Interiors. This means that CAMRA has identified this pub as being in the "first division" with regard to the historic quality of its interior design. This is one of fewer than 300 pubs chosen for their impressive, largely intact, historical interiors from the estimated 50,000 pubs that exist in the United Kingdom.

The room that attracts most attention is labelled "B". Snug "B" contains a 1920s hearth and a style of seating that is now found in only a small number of such "snugs" in England. The only other snug with high backed seats in Derbyshire is at the Holly Bush Inn, Makeney. The name "B" is a peculiarity of local licensing which previously made landlords clearly indicate which rooms were licensed for the consumption of alcoholic beverages. Each licensed room, including the cellar, was given an identifying letter. Like other features of the pub the reason for it being created has now disappeared, but the sign "B" remains. The requirement to label the room "B" is long forgotten, but previous landlords refused to have it changed. In the early 1990s, the landlords feared that the brewery that owned the building were planning to sell the pub. This may have resulted in the interior being refurbished and as a result they bought the pub to prevent this happening. In the confusion, the landlords ended up running two pubs in Spondon, although they did find time to install a kitchen and introduce pub-food at the Malt Shovel.

The most recent room's decoration dates from the 1990s and this has been internally divided by another bar. The smaller part has just tables and chairs whilst the larger section includes a full sized billiards table and a dartboard.

The pub serves traditional real ale and an extensive range of freshly cooked pub food, from bacon cobs and burgers to wholesome meals. The pub is not in the centre of Spondon, but down a minor road. Around the back of the pub is an extensive lawned beer garden with a covered area and children's climbing toys.

In 1333 or 1340, a disastrous fire started at a pub called the Malt Shovel and aided by the wind, swept through Spondon destroying the church and most of the houses. This is known as "the Great Fire of Spondon". Local historians although intrigued by the story say there is no proof that this pub sits on the same site as the 14th century pub, although both are known to be on the site of malting houses. The current pub was largely built in the late 18th or early 19th century, although some parts date from 1680.

Further reading
A short book describing the pub's history was published in 2011.

See also
Listed buildings in Spondon

References

Grade II listed buildings in Derby
Grade II listed pubs in Derbyshire
National Inventory Pubs